Valdres is a Norwegian newspaper, published in Fagernes, and covering the district of Valdres. The newspaper was founded in 1903, and its first editor was Olav Moe. The newspaper is issued four times a week. It had a circulation of 9,342 in 2008. Its editor is Torbjørn Moen.

References

Publications established in 1903
1903 establishments in Norway
Mass media in Oppland
Nord-Aurdal
Newspapers published in Norway